Anastrangalia laetifica is a species of beetle from family Cerambycidae found in Canada, United States, and Mexico. The males are all black, while the females have 4 black dots on their red coloured elytra. They feed on Frasera albicaulis.

References

Lepturinae
Beetles described in 1859
Beetles of North America